Melotone Records was an Australian record label sold in the Foy & Gibson's chain stores.

See also
 List of record labels
 Melotone Records (US)

Defunct record labels of Australia